Olivier Morel may refer to:

 Olivier Morel (filmmaker), French-American filmmaker, scholar and writer
 Olivier Morel (tennis) (born 1972), French tennis player